Boro Bhalo Lok Chhilo (English: He Was a Good Man) is a 1982 Dhallywood drama film directed by famous journalist and director Mohammad Mohiuddin. This film received National Film Awards in six categories.

Plot
Yasin is a well-educated son of a Pir of a village. Suddenly his father dies in a truck accident. Yasin returns to his village and searches for the truck driver to avenge his father's death. Since he is the son of the Pir, people of the village respect him and find something spiritual in him. He ignores it and starts staying in the home of one of his father's friends. Sometimes he talks with his father through his spiritual ability.

Pori Banu is the daughter of his father's friend and in a relationship with truck driver, Lokman. Yasin and Pori Banu become good friends. Meanwhile, he realizes his spiritual ability and starts accomplishing tasks quickly and easily. But when he starts falling love with Pori, the power starts diminishes. Now, he tries to get the power back.

Cast
 Abdur Razzak - Yasin
 Prabir Mitra - Lokman
 Anju Ghosh - Pori Banu
 Saifuddin Ahmed
 Anwar Hossain
 Abdul Matin

Soundtrack
The music of this film was directed by Alam Khan and lyrics were penned by Syed Shamsul Haque.

Awards

See also
 Dui Poisar Alta

References

External links
 Boro Bhalo Lok Chhilo at the Bangla Movie Database

1982 films
1982 romantic drama films
Bengali-language Bangladeshi films
Bangladeshi romantic drama films
Films scored by Alam Khan
1980s Bengali-language films